Harnai is a district in the north-east of Balochistan province of Pakistan. Harnai is the principal town of this district and serves as its capital.

The predominant first language is Pashto. Wanetsi or Tarino, a unique and archaic dialect of Pashto, is spoken in the district.

History
The name Harnai refers to an influential Hindu personality, Harnam Das, supposed founder of Harnai town, the capital of Harnai District. The town is quite close to Loralai, Ziarat, Sibi, and Quetta. Harnai is surrounded by imposing hills on all sides. The encircling hill ranges have the resounding names of 'Khalifat' and 'Zarghun'. Harnai proper has a population of about 200,000. The majority of the population of Harnai are Tareens and they mostly speak a unique dialect, or language, Tarino (Wanetsi), which is quite different from the Pushto spoken in other parts of Baluchistan and NWFP provinces, and is probably a mixture of Pushto, Urdu and other languages developed as a 'lingua franca' sometime during the 18th and 19th centuries, when a variety of people of different ethnic origins lived here. There seems to be no earlier historical record or trace of it. 

Until 2007 Harnai had been a tehsil of Sibi District, in August the Balochistan Government announced the Harnai district would be created by splitting the Sibi district and forming the new district from Harnai and Shahrag tehsils and the sub-tehsil of Khost.

Geography and climate
Harnai is surrounded by mountainous ranges. The minimum and maximum winter temperature of the area is −2˚C to 20˚C. The summer is extreme in the area and the minimum and maximum temperature fall between 20˚C to 48˚C. Harnai has a fertile rainy season during monsoon time. In general, Harnai has pleasant weather in the winter season. Harnai is one of the most beautiful cities of the Balochistan Province with plenty of water available in the streams. It is the only area of the production of fresh vegetables and fruits with fresh and clean water in the whole of Balochistan.

Demographics
At the time of the 2017 census the district had a population of 97,052, of which 51,964 were males and 45,069 females. Rural population was 72,490 (74.69%) while the urban population was 24,562 (25.31%). The literacy rate was 36.24% - the male literacy rate was 49.86% while the female literacy rate was 20.28%. 611 people in the district were from religious minorities.

At the time of the 2017 census, 83.48% of the population spoke Pashto, 12.65% Balochi and 1.37% Sindhi as their first language.

Villages
 
 
2Sazoo
3.Sunari
4.spentangi
5.shenkhuch
6.kilimerza
7.kachari 
8.pir
9.dub
10.kurazawara
11'Gochina
12 kili Ghadyan

References

Bibliography

External links

 Harnai District at www.balochistan.gov.pk
Harnai District Development Profile 2011 
 Harnai  at 

 
Districts of Pakistan
Districts of Balochistan, Pakistan